Frederick Avery Johnson (January 2, 1833 – July 17, 1893) was an American politician and banker who served a U.S. Representative from New York from 1883 to 1887. He was a member of the Republican Party and a resident of Glens Falls, New York.

Biography
Born in Fort Edward, New York, Johnson attended the common schools and graduated from Glens Falls Academy in nearby Glens Falls, New York. He married Harriet Elizabeth Locke on September 1, 1858.

Career
Johnson engaged in banking and in the wool business in New York City and later in banking in Glens Falls. He served as president of the village of Glens Falls.

Elected as a Republican to the 48th United States Congress representing New York's eighteenth district, Johnson served from March 4, 1883, to March 3, 1885. He was then elected to the 49th United States Congress representing New York's twenty-first district from March 4, 1885, to March 3, 1887.  He was not a candidate for renomination in 1886.

Death
Johnson died at Glens Falls, Warren County, New York on July 17, 1893 (age 60 years, 196 days). He is interred at Glens Falls Cemetery (also known as  Bay Street Cemetery), Glens Falls, New York.

References

External links

1833 births
1893 deaths
Politicians from Glens Falls, New York
Republican Party members of the United States House of Representatives from New York (state)
19th-century American politicians
Burials in Warren County, New York